Richard Herbert (by 1532 – 1603/5), of Montgomery and Park in Llanwnog, Montgomeryshire, was a Welsh politician.

Herbert was a Member of Parliament for Montgomery Boroughs in March 1553.

References

1600s deaths
16th-century Welsh politicians
People from Montgomeryshire
Members of the Parliament of England (pre-1707) for constituencies in Wales
Year of birth uncertain
English MPs 1553 (Edward VI)